Miles Bergman (born 18 October 2001) is an Australian rules footballer who plays for Port Adelaide in the Australian Football League (AFL). He made his AFL debut in Round 1 of the 2021 AFL season against  at Marvel Stadium.

Bergman's junior club was Hampton Rovers. As a schoolboy for St Bede's College, he won the Neale Daniher Medal, being named best afield in the Herald Sun Shield. He played for the Sandringham Dragons in the NAB League U18's competition.

In Bergman's draft year, he was touted as a versatile mid-sized player and was considered "a top-10 bolter" by AFL Draft Central. At the 2019 AFL draft, Bergman was taken with Pick 14 for Port Adelaide. He was drafted as a mid-forward, though he has developed his game on both the wing and half-back. Bergman impressed after his Round 1 debut in 2021, being nominated for the Rising Star in the Round 21 Showdown against Adelaide, collecting 23 disposals alongside 4 tackles. He played all but 1 game in the 2021 season.

AFL statistics
Statistics are correct to the end of the 2021 AFL season

|-
|- style="background-color: #EAEAEA"
| scope="row" style="text-align:center" | 2021
|style="text-align:center;"|Port Adelaide
| 14 || 23 || 7 || 7 || 199 || 126 || 325 || 101 || 42 || 0.30 || 0.30 || 8.65 || 5.48 || 14.13 || 4.39 || 1.83
|-
|- scope="row" style="background-color: #EAEAEA; font-weight:bold; text-align: center; width:2em" class="sortbottom"
| colspan=3| Career
| 23
| 7
| 7
| 199
| 126
| 325
| 101
| 42
| 0.30
| 0.30
| 8.65
| 5.48
| 14.13
| 4.39
| 1.83
|}

References

External links

2001 births
Living people
Port Adelaide Football Club players
Port Adelaide Football Club players (all competitions)
Australian rules footballers from Victoria (Australia)
Sandringham Dragons players